Mikhail Kazantsev (born 30 July 1927) is a Soviet former sprinter. He competed in the men's 100 metres at the 1952 Summer Olympics.

Competition record

References

External links
 

1927 births
Possibly living people
Athletes (track and field) at the 1952 Summer Olympics
Soviet male sprinters
Olympic athletes of the Soviet Union
Place of birth missing (living people)